Mark Christopher Toner (born 1964) is a U.S. Foreign Service Officer and former Spokesperson for the United States Department of State.

Early life and education
Toner was raised in Chadds Ford, Pennsylvania, graduating from the Salesianum School in nearby Wilmington, Delaware in 1982. He earned a B.A. degree from the University of Notre Dame in 1986 and later studied journalism at the University of California at Berkeley. Toner received a graduate degree from the National Defense University’s Industrial College of the Armed Forces. He was also a Peace Corps volunteer in Liberia.

Career
As a career Foreign Service Officer, Toner served overseas in West Africa and Europe. Toner was the Information Officer in Dakar, Senegal, the Public Affairs Officer in Kraków, Poland, and the Spokesman for the U.S. Mission to NATO, in Brussels, Belgium. In Washington, Toner worked as a senior advisor for the Senate Foreign Relations Committee; as a Senior Watch Officer in the Department's Operations Center; and as the Director of the European Bureau’s Press and Public Outreach Division.

Toner was Deputy Spokesperson for the State Department from 2010 to 2013, serving with Spokesperson Victoria Nuland. Toner became Deputy Spokesperson again on June 1, 2015. Following Rear Admiral John Kirby's departure as the Department's Chief Spokesperson on January 20, 2017, Toner became Acting Spokesperson. He announced the pass of the spokesperson baton to Heather Nauert on April 27, 2017.

References

External links

Living people
People from Chadds Ford Township, Pennsylvania
Salesianum School alumni
University of Notre Dame alumni
Peace Corps volunteers
United States Foreign Service personnel
National Defense University alumni
Dwight D. Eisenhower School for National Security and Resource Strategy alumni
United States Department of State officials
United States Department of State spokespeople
1964 births